Helen G. Boosalis (August 28, 1919 - June 15, 2009) was an American Democratic Party politician from Nebraska.

Early life
Helen Boosalis was born as Helen Geankoplis in Minneapolis, Minnesota to Greek immigrant parents, where she grew up working in her father's Minneapolis restaurant.
In 1945 she married Michael Gus "Mike" Boosalis, a World War II veteran and graduate of the University of Minnesota. Their daughter, Mary Beth, was born three years later. In 1951, the family moved to Lincoln, Nebraska, where her husband had accepted a job at the University of Nebraska.

Career 
In 1959 Boosalis was elected to the Lincoln City Council, scoring an upset victory over an incumbent, and was subsequently reelected three times. She won another upset victory over incumbent Sam Schwartzkopf to become the city's first woman mayor in 1975. From 1981 to 1982, she served as the first female President of the U.S. Conference of Mayors.

Shortly after completing her tenure as Mayor in 1983, Boosalis was appointed as Director of the Nebraska Department of Aging in the Cabinet of then-Governor Bob Kerrey, she served in that post until she announced her candidacy for Governor of Nebraska in the 1986 election. Boosalis received a plurality of the vote in the crowded Democratic primary with 43.8% of the votes.

In the primary, Boosalis carried 77 of Nebraska's 93 counties, Domina carried 16 counties in the Northeast section of the state, and Beutler carried no counties.

Boosalis went on to lose to the Republican candidate, State Treasurer Kay A. Orr in the general election.  Boosalis receiving 47.1% of the vote and Orr received 52.9%. This election was the first state gubernatorial election in U.S. history where the candidates of both major national parties were women.

Post-politics 
Following her electoral defeat, Boosalis was an active member of several state and national organizations, most notably serving as Chairwoman of Board of Directors of the American Association of Retired Persons.

Personal life 
Boosalis died from a brain tumor on June 15, 2009 at the age of 89.

References

Sources 
 
 

|-

1919 births
2009 deaths
20th-century American politicians
20th-century American women politicians
AARP people
American people of Greek descent
Deaths from brain cancer in the United States
Mayors of Lincoln, Nebraska
Nebraska city council members
Nebraska Democrats
State cabinet secretaries of Nebraska
Women mayors of places in Nebraska
Presidents of the United States Conference of Mayors
Women city councillors in Nebraska
21st-century American women